Aille River may refer to two Irish rivers:
Aille River (County Clare)
Aille River (County Mayo)